The Pintupi are an Australian Aboriginal group who are part of the Western Desert cultural group and whose traditional land is in the area west of Lake Macdonald and Lake Mackay in Western Australia. These people moved (or were moved) into the Aboriginal communities of Papunya and Haasts Bluff in the west of the Northern Territory in the 1940s–1980s. The last Pintupi to leave their traditional lifestyle in the desert, in 1984, are a group known as the Pintupi Nine, also sometimes called the "lost tribe".

Over recent decades groups of Pintupi have moved back to their traditional country, as part of what has come to be called the outstation movement. These groups set up the communities of Kintore (Walungurru in Pintupi) in the Northern Territory, Kiwirrkura and Jupiter Well (in Pintupi: Puntutjarrpa) in Western Australia.  There was also a recent dramatic increase in Pintupi populations and speakers of the Pintupi language.

Country
Their western extension ran to near Winbaruku, while their southern frontier was in the vicinity of Johnstone Hill.

History
Inhabiting a very remote part of Australia, the Pintupi were among the last Aboriginal Australians to leave their traditional lifestyle. For many, this occurred as a result of the Blue Streak missile tests which began in the 1960s. As these missiles would have a trajectory landing in the desert areas known to still be inhabited, government officials decided that these people should be relocated. A number of trips were made to the area and Aboriginal people were located and moved (or encouraged to move) into one of the settlements on the eastern fringe of the desert, such as Haasts Bluff, Hermannsburg and Papunya. As a result of different people leaving the desert at different times and in different directions, Pintupi have wound up living at a variety of communities around the edge of the desert, including Warburton, Kaltukatjara (formerly known as Docker River), Balgo and Mulan, but the majority reside at the major Pintupi communities of Kintore, Kiwirrkura and Papunya.

In the 1960s, the Menzies Liberal government forced the removal of traditional-living Pintupi to settlements east of their country, closer to Alice Springs. The government argued that they were not ready to live in modern society and needed to be re-educated before assimilation into white society. In practice, this meant relocation from their traditional lands and suppression of their language, art and culture.

This policy also involved the forced removal of thousands of Aboriginal children from their parents and their dispersal into government or religious institutions or foster care (see Stolen Generation).

At Papunya, a government settlement, Pintupi mixed with Warlpiri, Arrernte, Anmatyerre and Luritja language groups, but formed the largest language group. Conditions were so bad that 129 people, or almost one-sixth of the residents, died of treatable diseases such as hepatitis, meningitis and encephalitis between 1962 and 1966.

Pintupi kinship

In common with neighbouring groups, such as the Warlpiri, the Pintupi have a complex kinship system, with eight different kin groups, made more so by distinct prefixes for male and female skin names; "Tj" for males, "N" for females:

Prominent Pintupi

 Anatjari Tjakamarra
 Kaapa Tjampitjinpa
 Mick Namarari Tjapaltjarri
 Clifford Possum Tjapaltjarri
 Billy Stockman Tjapaltjarri
 Timmy Payungka Tjapangati
 Turkey Tolson Tjupurrula
 Eileen Napaltjarri
 Tjunkiya Napaltjarri
 Wintjiya Napaltjarri
 Makinti Napanangka
 Naata Nungurrayi
Ningura Napurrula

See also
 Geoff Bardon
 Bindibu expedition
 Honey ant dreaming
 Pintupi language
 Pintupi Nine
 Beds Are Burning - a rock and roll protest song by Midnight Oil band about the Pintupi struggles

Notes

Citations

Sources

External links
 native patrol report
 National Museum of Australia journal
 Report on Patrol to Lake Mackay Area June / July 1957
 Patrols in Central Australia (Western Desert)

 
Aboriginal peoples of the Northern Territory